Pukara (Aymara and Quechua for fortress, Hispanicized spelling Pucara) is a  mountain in the Andes of Bolivia. It is situated in the Oruro Department, Poopó Province, Poopó Municipality.

References 

Mountains of Oruro Department